The Terryland Forest Park is an urban forest park in Galway, Ireland. It was launched in January 2000 as the largest such project in Ireland with a plan to involve the citizens of Galway city in planting 500,000  native Irish trees in an area of  not far from the city centre.

Background
Though under the auspices of Galway City Council, it had a community presence in a multi-sectoral management steering committee which led to a high level of involvement by local people in the planning, design and programme events during the period 2000–2003.

References

External links
Friends of the Terryland Forest

Irish Naturalist's Journal, vol 28, no 10, 2007
Galway City Development Plan

Forests and woodlands of the Republic of Ireland
Parks in County Galway